Andrei Nikolayevich Cherenkov (born 8 October 1976) is a Russian professional football manager and a former player. He is the manager of youth team of FC Chayka Peschanokopskoye.

Club career
He made his debut for FC Rostselmash Rostov-on-Don on 12 September 1998 in a Russian Cup game against FC Lada-Grad Dimitrovgrad. He made his second appearance for Rostselmash on 17 July 1999 in an Intertoto Cup game against Varaždin.

He played in the Russian Football National League for FC SKA-Energiya Khabarovsk in 2003.

References

1976 births
Living people
Russian footballers
Association football forwards
FC Zhemchuzhina Sochi players
FC Rostov players
FC SKA-Khabarovsk players
FC Torpedo Minsk players
FC Nika Krasny Sulin players
FC Novokuznetsk players
FC Dynamo Vologda players
FC Smena Komsomolsk-na-Amure players
Belarusian Premier League players
Russian expatriate footballers
Expatriate footballers in Belarus
Russian football managers
FC Amur Blagoveshchensk players